RK Jugović is a Serbian handball club based in Kać, Novi Sad. They compete in the top tier Serbian handball league, the Arkus league.

History
Founded as RK Mladost in 1956, the club changed its name to RK Jugović in 1960. They made their Yugoslav Handball Championship debut in 1984. The club achieved its greatest success by winning the EHF Challenge Cup in the 2000–01 season. After spending more than 30 consecutive seasons in the top flight, they suffered relegation from the Serbian Handball Super League in 2018.

Team

Current squad 
Squad for the 2022–23 season

Technical staff
 Head Coach:  Predrag Topić
 Physiotherapist:  Radovan Kovačev

Transfers

Transfers for the 2022–23 season

Joining 
  Milan Kosanović (GK)
  Nikola Kovačević (LB) from  RK Vojvodina
  Strahinja Travar (LB) from  RK Mokra Gora
  Milan Bošković (LW) from  RK Dinamo Pančevo
  Saša Terzić (RW) from  RK Metaloplastika
  Marko Knežević (CB) from  RK Crvena zvezda

Leaving 
  Borislav Milovanović (GK) to  RK Rudar Kostolac
  Zlatko Rakić (CB) to  RK Kikinda Grindex
  Danijel Radisavljević (RW) to  RK Dubočica 54

Previous squads

Accomplishments 

EHF Challenge Cup
 : 2001

Serbian Cup
 : 2007

European record

EHF Challenge Cup

Former club members

Notable former players

  Nikola Crnoglavac (2010–2015)
  Tihomir Doder (1997–2003, 2020–2021)
  Šandor Hodik (1989–1993, 2002–2004)
  Branko Kankaraš (2006–2013)
  Milan Kosanović (2022–)
  Marko Krsmančić (2007–2010)
  Marko Krivokapić (1992–1998)
  Milorad Krivokapić (1996–2002)
  Dobrivoje Marković (2001–2008, 2020)
  Dejan Milosavljev (2011–2016)
  Nenad Peruničić (1990–1993, 2007–2008, 2015)
  Rajko Prodanović (2002–2008)
  Árpád Sterbik (1996–2001)
  Dragan Sudžum (2012–2013)
  Milan Torbica (2001–2002)
  Svetislav Verkić (1998–2003)
  Žarko Marković (2003–2006)
  Mirko Milašević (2003–2004, 2020–2021)

Former coaches

References

External links
 
 

Jugovic
Handball clubs established in 1956
1956 establishments in Yugoslavia
Sport in Novi Sad